The United Democratic Party (UDP) was a political party in Malaysia.

History
The party was established by Lim Chong Eu and several other former members of the Malayan Chinese Association (MCA) on 21 April 1962. Largely supported by middle-class Chinese voters, the party won a single seat in the 1964 general elections, with Lim elected in Tanjong.

The party was dissolved on 23 June 1968 after Lim had helped to establish the Parti Gerakan Rakyat Malaysia (Gerakan).

General elections results

State elections results

References

Defunct political parties in Malaysia
1962 establishments in Malaya
Political parties established in 1962
1968 disestablishments in Malaysia
Political parties disestablished in 1968